Bhakarkhadi7km (Marathi: 'भाकरखाडी ७ किमी') is a 2014 Marathi language Indian film.  Bhakarkhadi 7 km is written and produced by Dinesh Vaidya and directed by Umesh Namjoshi.

Plot
Bhakharkhadi 7 km tells the story of a young doctor who aspires to a career as a surgeon in America.  His dreams are shattered by his involvement in one emergency surgery and the dirty politics surrounding the case. As a scapegoat, he is sent to a remote Marathi village to work in their primary health center.  The film highlights rural Marathi culture and lifestyle alongside contemporary Indian urban life and youth.

Reception
Marathi Movie World describes the film as carrying a strong social message, while remaining entertaining and breathtaking.

Production

Cast
 Adult cast 
 Aniket Vishwasrao
 Renuka Shahane
 Veena Jamkar 
 Anant Jog
 Uday Tikekar
 Girish Oak
 Anand Abhyankar
 Bharat Ganeshpure
 Ashok Samel 
 Suyash Tilak
 Apurva Nemlekar
 Vikas Pandurang Patil 
 Vijay Nikam 
 Kiranraj Pote

 Children
 Shroyaman Rana 
 Machindra Gadkar 
 Samikshya Manjerekar

Crew
 Producers: Dinesh Vaidya and Priyanka Prashant Kamat
 Story: Dinesh Vaidya
 Screenplay: Nandu Pardeshi
 Art Director: Hemant kakirde
 Cinematography: Prasad Bhende
 Editor: Jayant Jathar
 Music: Kamlesh Bandkamkar
 Lyrics: Dinesh Vaidya
Aniket Vishwasrao was selected to play the male lead whereas Veena Jamkar was cast opposite him. Veteran Theatre and Bollywood actress Renuka Shahane was said to play a pivotal role in this Movie. Anant Jog was cast as the Antagonist of the Movie

References

External links
 

2014 films
2010s Marathi-language films